Zgornje Laže is a small settlement in the Municipality of Slovenske Konjice in eastern Slovenia. It lies in the hills north of Spodnje Laže. The area is part of the traditional region of Styria. The entire municipality is now included in the Savinja Statistical Region.

References

External links
Zgornje Laže at Geopedia
Slovenija beautiful landscapes

Populated places in the Municipality of Slovenske Konjice